Sir Richard Harrison (31 August 1583 – 5 May 1655) was an English politician who sat in the House of Commons variously between 1621 and 1640. He supported the Royalist side in the English Civil War.

Harrison was the son of  Richard Harrison of Hurst in Berkshire and his wife Elizabeth, daughter of Thomas Anton of Stratfield Saye in Hampshire, the Clerk of the Court of Wards and Liveries. His father died in 1587 and his mother remarried to Robert Marsh of Edmonton in Middlesex and Finchampstead in Berkshire. Harrison matriculated at St Mary Hall, Oxford on 1 July 1603 aged 19.  He inherited the estates of Hurst and East Court at Finchampstead from a grand uncle Richard Warde (the son of Richard Warde Senior MP).  He was knighted on 31 August 1621. 

In 1621 Harrison was elected Member of Parliament (MP) for  Wootton Bassett. He was elected MP for Berkshire in 1624 and again in 1628 and sat until 1629 when King Charles decided to rule without parliament for eleven years.  Harrison lived at his manor-house at Hurst, and was a friend of Archbishop Laud, who referred to him in his diary in 1625 and 1626 when Laud visited Sir Francis Windebank at Haines Hill in Hurst. He is said to have been created a baronet but the patent was lost. He was High Sheriff of Berkshire in 1636. 

In April 1640, Harrison was elected MP for Windsor in the Short Parliament. In the civil war, his son Richard fought on the Royalist side and the family suffered in the royal cause.
 
Harrison married Frances, the daughter of George Garrard, of Dorney in Buckinghamshire, and his wife, Margaret Dacres. They had two sons and three daughters.

Harrison died at the age of 72 and was buried in Hurst parish church.

References

 
 
 

1583 births
1655 deaths
High Sheriffs of Berkshire
People from Hurst, Berkshire
People from Finchampstead
Cavaliers
Members of the Parliament of England for Berkshire
English MPs 1621–1622
English MPs 1624–1625
English MPs 1628–1629
English MPs 1640 (April)
Alumni of St Mary Hall, Oxford